Princess Myat Phaya Lat (4 October 1883 – 4 April 1956) was a Burmese royal princess and most senior member of the Royal House of Konbaung. She was the Royal Householder after the death of her father, King Thibaw while in exile in 1916.

Biography
Myat Phaya Lat was born on 4 October 1883 at the Royal Palace, Mandalay. She was the second daughter of King Thibaw by his chief queen Supayalat. 

The princess was married on 20 February 1917 at the Collector's Bungalow, Ratnagiri, Bombay, India, to Khin Maung Lat (Burma Raja Sahib), Private Secretary to Ex-King Thibaw, sometime Officer in the Indian Police, a nephew of King Thibaw and son of the Duke and Duchess of Ngape and Mindat. She died on 4 April 1956 at Kalimpong, India, having adopted the son of her Nepalese maidservant, named Maung Lu Gy.

References 

Konbaung dynasty
1883 births
1956 deaths
Pretenders to the Burmese throne
Burmese people of World War II